Stag is a 1997 American thriller film, directed by Gavin Wilding, made for HBO and later released theatrically after drawing large ratings. Stag features an ensemble cast headed by Mario Van Peebles, Andrew McCarthy, Kevin Dillon, Taylor Dayne, John Stockwell, William McNamara, John Henson, Jerry Stiller and Ben Gazzara. It was produced by Lions Gate Entertainment.

Plot

At Ken's bachelor party, a group of men are partying with two stripper sisters named Serena (Taylor Dayne) and Kelly (Jenny McShane). Serena steals one of the men and makes love to him, while a group of men party with her sister Kelly. Kelly accidentally falls onto the stone floor and dies. Another person, her bodyguard, also dies in an accident. Arriving and witnessing the accidental deaths of Kelly and her bodyguard, Serena begins crying and confronts a group of men, who give a weak apology.

Two of the men then kidnap Serena and hold her hostage upstairs. A group of men cover their tracks and eliminate the bodies of the two deceased people. A rescuer frees Serena, but he and Serena are kidnapped by their captors. He and Serena are later rescued. Grabbing the two guns in her hands, Serena shoots and murders her kidnappers.

The reason the wild party began was to turn the tables on Ken, who had always made others the subject of his pranks.

Cast
 Mario Van Peebles
 Andrew McCarthy
 Kevin Dillon
 Taylor Dayne
 John Stockwell
 William McNamara
 John Henson
 Jerry Stiller
 Ben Gazzara

Release 
Stag premiered on HBO in June 1997.

Reception 
Brendan Kelly of Variety called it "an efficient psychological thriller" that "becomes a tad predictable".  Nathan Rabin of The A.V. Club called it "stagey, badly written, and mind-numbingly predictable".  TV Guide rated it 2/4 stars and called it "a sometimes gripping, sometimes frustrating suspense drama".  Kevin Thomas of the Los Angeles Times called it "relentlessly obvious and tedious".

It has been compared to 1998's Very Bad Things, a film which also revolves around the death of a stripper at a bachelor party. The producers of Very Bad Things were not aware of Stag while the movie was being written. By the time Very Bad Things began being financed, the producers had found out about Stag, and changes were made to the script to make it less similar.

References

External links 

1997 films
1990s psychological thriller films
American psychological thriller films
HBO Films films
Lionsgate films
Films about striptease
Films produced by John Dunning
1990s English-language films
1990s American films